Meenakshi Govindarajan is an Indian actress who has appeared in Tamil language films. After making her film debut in the Tamil film Kennedy Club (2019), she has been in films including Velan (2021),  Veerapandiyapuram (2022) and Cobra (2022)

Career
Meenakshi completed her schooling from Seventh Day Adventist Matriculation Higher Secondary School, Madurai, before completing a visual communications degree from Women's Christian College, Chennai. She first appeared as an actress on Star Vijay's Saravanan Meenatchi, before partaking on the network's Villa To Village and Run Baby Run shows.

Meenakshi made her film debut through Suseenthiran's Kennedy Club (2019), where she portrayed a kabaddi player coached by the characters portrayed by Bharathiraja and Sasikumar. She later appeared in the family drama Velan (2021), and described her work in the film as a "memorable experience".

In 2022, Meenakshi was seen in Suseenthiran's action drama Veerapandiyapuram'' opposite Jai.

Filmography

Films

Television

References

External links
 
 
 

Indian film actresses
Tamil actresses
Living people
Actresses in Tamil cinema
Year of birth missing (living people)
21st-century Indian actresses